is a district located in Oshima Subprefecture, Hokkaido, Japan.

As of 2004, the district has an estimated population of 7,424 and a density of 23.89 persons per km2. The total area is 310.75 km2.

Towns
Oshamanbe

Merger
On October 1, 2005, the town of Yakumo (from Yamakoshi District) absorbed the town of Kumaishi (from Nishi District, Hiyama Subprefecture) to create the new and expanded town of Yakumo (now in the newly created Futami District). The former town of Kumaishi joined Oshima Subprefecture at the same time.

Districts in Hokkaido